Devpura Rupetha is a village development committee in Dhanusa District of south-eastern Nepal. As per Nepal Census 2001 It had a population of 8,348 persons living in 1,259 individual households.
As Nepal constitution 2072 Depura rupaitha is in sub-metropolicity-20. It is highly developed village. Jathi to janakpur 6lane road has been completed. Airport is about 1.5km away. Some tourist place is like nocha pokhari,

References

External links
UN map of the municipalities of Dhanusa District

Populated places in Dhanusha District